Michael W. Foley (born March 2, 1964) is an American electrical engineer, wireless expert and executive director of the Bluetooth Special Interest Group, a consortium of over 12,000 companies who come together to create and promote Bluetooth wireless technology.

Foley earned his Ph.D. in electrical engineering from Arizona State University in 1992, a master's degree from Arizona State University in 1989 and a Bachelor of Science degree in electrical engineering from the University of Iowa in 1985.

Foley joined the Bluetooth SIG in March 2004 as the executive director. He is responsible for guiding the qualification and interoperability programs, promotion of the technology, the specification publications, and the long-term road map of Bluetooth wireless technology.

Prior to joining the Bluetooth SIG, Foley worked with Bluetooth wireless technology and other wireless technologies as a senior wireless architect with Microsoft. While there, he played a pivotal role in the creation and development of the wireless desktop vision and 802.11. Foley also helped shape the Bluetooth standard from its inception, as a SIG Board Member, and later chairman of the board from 2002 to 2003.

Under Foley's direction, Bluetooth technology has experienced phenomenal growth and consumer acceptance. Since his arrival at the helm of the Bluetooth SIG, he has pushed through an ambitious roadmap, demanding substantial improvements in interoperability and security.  In the fall of 2007, Foley forged a merger with the Wibree Forum to bring Wibree technology under the Bluetooth umbrella to create the Bluetooth low energy specification, expected in late 2009. In April 2009, Foley brought to market Bluetooth 3.0, the high speed version of the technology utilizing 802.11 radios which will allow mobile devices to provide high speed transfer of entertainment data.

In 2010 along with Titan Industries and Bharat Heavy Electricals Limited he designed the 2010 Commonwealth Games Baton which had a LED and a GPS.

Awards and recognition
In 2006, Foley received the Special Recognition Award from wireless industry publication Wireless Week on behalf of the Bluetooth SIG in honor of its significant progress of Bluetooth technology in 2005.
In 2007, Foley was awarded the Telematics Leadership Award from Telematics Update for achievements and innovation in the telematics market with Bluetooth wireless technology.
In 2008, Foley was named a finalist in the Executive of the Year category of the EE Times ACE Awards.
In 2008, Foley was named to the RCR Wireless Movers and Shakers list highlighting those responsible for making things happen in the wireless industry.
In 2012, Foley was inducted into the Bluetooth SIG Hall of Fame.

References

1964 births
Living people
American electrical engineers
Arizona State University alumni
University of Iowa alumni
Ira A. Fulton Schools of Engineering alumni